The siege of Constantinople in 1394–1402 was a long blockade of the capital of the Byzantine Empire by the Ottoman Sultan Bayezid I. Already in 1391, the rapid Ottoman conquests in the Balkans had cut off the city from its hinterland. After constructing the fortress of Anadoluhisarı to control the Bosporus strait, from 1394 on, Bayezid tried to starve the city into submission by blockading it both by land and, less effectively, by sea. 

The Crusade of Nicopolis was launched to relieve the city, but it was decisively defeated by the Ottomans. In 1399, a French expeditionary force under Marshal de Boucicaut arrived, but was unable to achieve much. The situation became so dire that in December 1399 the Byzantine emperor, Manuel II Palaiologos, left the city to tour the courts of Western Europe in a desperate attempt to secure military aid. The emperor was welcomed with honours, but secured no definite pledges of support. Constantinople was saved when Bayezid had to confront the invasion of Timur in 1402. Bayezid's defeat in the Battle of Ankara in 1402, and the Ottoman civil war that followed, even allowed the Byzantines to regain some lost territories, in the Treaty of Gallipoli.

References

Sources
 
 
 
 
 

1390s conflicts
1400s conflicts
1390s in the Byzantine Empire
1400s in the Byzantine Empire
1390s in the Ottoman Empire
1400s in the Ottoman Empire
Constantinople 1394
1394
Constantinople 1394